Frano Selak or Frane Selak (14 June 1929 – 30 November 2016) was a Croatian man who was known for his frequent brushes with death. He has been described as either the world's luckiest or unluckiest man.

Selak's near-death experiences began in January 1962 when he was riding a train through a cold, rainy canyon and the train flew off the tracks and crashed in a river. An unknown person pulled Selak to safety, while 17 other passengers drowned. Selak suffered a broken arm and hypothermia. The next year, during his first and only plane ride, he was blown out of a malfunctioning plane door and landed in a haystack; the plane crashed, killing 19 people. Three years after that, in 1966, a bus that he was riding in skidded off the road and into a river, drowning four passengers. Selak swam to shore with a few cuts and bruises.

In 1970, his car caught fire as he was driving and he managed to escape before the fuel tank blew up. Three years later, in another driving incident, the engine of his car was doused with hot oil from a malfunctioning fuel pump, causing flames to shoot through the air vents. Selak's hair was completely singed in this incident, but he was otherwise unharmed. In 1995, he was struck by a bus in Zagreb, but sustained only minor injuries. In 1996 he eluded a head-on collision with a United Nations truck on a mountain curve by swerving into a guardrail, which gave way under the force. Selak was not wearing a seatbelt and was ejected out of the car, clinging to a tree branch as he watched his vehicle fall 300 feet. Two days after his 73rd birthday, Selak won €900,000 (US$1,110,000) (£702,920) in the lottery. At the time of his win, he also married for the fifth time. While he purchased two houses and a boat with his winnings, in 2010 he decided to give most of the remaining money away to relatives and friends after deciding to live a frugal lifestyle.

None of Selak's near-death experiences have ever been independently verified, and at times some of his accounts of his near-death experiences were inconsistent. He died at the age of 87.

References

Music educators
Lottery winners
Croatian educators
1929 births
2016 deaths
Fall survivors